Area 1 can refer to:

 Area 1 (Nevada National Security Site)
 Area One, music festival
 Brodmann area 1